The proper palmar digital arteries travel along the sides of the phalanges (along the contiguous sides of the index, middle, ring, and little fingers), each artery lying just below (dorsal to) its corresponding digital nerve.

Alternative names for these arteries are: proper volar digital arteries, collateral digital arteries, arteriae digitales palmares propriae, or aa. digitales volares propriae.

They anastomose freely in the subcutaneous tissue of the finger tips and by smaller branches near the interphalangeal joints.

Each also gives off a couple of dorsal branches which anastomose with the dorsal digital arteries, and supply the soft parts on the back of the second and third phalanges, including the matrix of the fingernail.

The proper palmar digital artery for the medial side of the little finger arises directly from the ulnar artery deep to the palmaris brevis muscle, but the rest arise from the common palmar digital arteries.

See also
 Superficial palmar arch
 Proper palmar digital nerves of median nerve

Footnotes and references

Additional Images

External links

Arteries of the upper limb